Mieczysław Kasprzycki (13 December 1910 – 21 October 2001) was a Polish ice hockey player. He played for HC Vítkovice, Slavia Praha, AZS Katowice, Dąb Katowice, Cracovia, and KTH Krynica during his career. Born in Ostrava, in what is now the Czech Republic, Kasprzycki first played hockey there and moved to Poland in 1935. He won the Polish league title five times in his career. Kasprzycki also played for the Polish national team at the 1936 and 1948 Winter Olympics, and two World Championships: in 1939 and 1947. After retiring he coached the Polish national team from 1952 until 1955, including the 1952 Winter Olympics and three World Championships.

References

External links
 

1910 births
2001 deaths
HC Slavia Praha players
HC Vítkovice players
Ice hockey players at the 1936 Winter Olympics
Ice hockey players at the 1948 Winter Olympics
MKS Cracovia (ice hockey) players
KTH Krynica players
Olympic ice hockey players of Poland
Poland men's national ice hockey team coaches
Polish ice hockey coaches
Polish ice hockey defencemen
Sportspeople from Ostrava
Polish expatriate ice hockey people
People from Austrian Silesia
People from Cieszyn Silesia